A narco tank, also called rhino trucks or , is an improvised fighting vehicle used by drug cartels. The vehicles are primarily civilian trucks with improvised vehicle armour, which adds operational mobility, tactical offensive, and defensive capabilities when fighting law enforcement or rivals during drug trafficking activities.

Mexico 
In Mexico, narco tanks have been extensively manufactured and operated by drug cartels and other gangs involved in the Mexican Drug War. They are often modified semi-trucks, dump trucks, pickup trucks, or other large vehicles not intended for such a purpose, and come equipped with varying levels of protection and attack capability. Mexican authorities have seized about twenty such armored trucks in the state of Tamaulipas alone, four of which were later destroyed. Cartels also began to build narco tanks with the armor installed on the interior rather than outside the vehicle, to draw away suspicion from rival drug cartels and the Mexican government. On May 22, 2011, one such vehicle belonging to the Sinaloa Cartel was seized in the state of Jalisco. In 2015, Mexican authorities found a narco tank factory in Nuevo Laredo, Tamaulipas that had eight vehicles in it, which were in the process of having armor plates with gun holes added to them. Some narco tanks are equipped with improvised battering rams on the front to break through roadblocks.

See also
Illegal drug trade
Los Zetas, drug cartel believed to be responsible for most narco-tanks
Mexican Drug War
Narco sub
Technical (vehicle)
Killdozer (Bulldozer)

References

Further reading

External links
Narco tanks found by the Mexican authorities
Earlier version of a narco tank
Los "monstruos" del narco 
Tanks Encyclopedia provides an excellent look into Narco Tanks

Illegal drug trade techniques
Improvised armoured fighting vehicles